Saint Mommolin may refer to

 Mommolin of Fleury, abbot of Fleury Abbey between September 632 and January 663
 Mommolin of Noyon died c. 686), Bishop of Noyon-Tournai in Belgium